Mother of the Bride may refer to:

 Mother of the Bride (1963 film), a 1963 Egyptian film
Mother of the Bride (1978 film), a 1978 Argentine film
 Mother of the Bride (1993 film), a 1993 TV film
a 1974 episode of the TV series The ABC Afternoon Playbreak